The Upper Tampa Bay Park is a Hillsborough County park located on the Double Branch Peninsula, approximately three miles southeast of Oldsmar, which is west of Tampa. The park has been only minimally developed because the environment is so fragile and sensitive.

Within the park is the Upper Tampa Bay Archeological District, which was added to the US National Register of Historic Places on December 10, 1985. The area was once inhabited by Tocobaga Indians (from approximately 900 A.D. until the 1500s), and they left mounds of shellfish.

The area is inhabited by redfish, snook, dolphins, manatees, and otters, and includes the Double Branch Creek. There are observation decks, picnic shelters, a playground, a nature center, and walking trails. Canoe and kayak rentals are offered.

References

External links
Hillsborough County listings at National Register of Historic Places
Hillsborough County listings at Florida's Office of Cultural and Historical Programs

Archaeological sites in Florida
Parks in Hillsborough County, Florida
National Register of Historic Places in Hillsborough County, Florida
Archaeological sites on the National Register of Historic Places in Florida